Susette may refer to:

Susette La Flesche, also called Inshata Theumba (1854–1903), Native American writer, lecturer, interpreter and artist
Susette Gontard (1769–1802), dubbed Diotima by the German poet Friedrich Hölderlin, the inspiration for Hölderlin's novel Hyperion
Susette Hirzel, known as Susette (1769–1858), Swiss painter
Susette Schultz Keast (1892–1932), American painter
Mari Susette Sandoz (1896–1966), Nebraska novelist, biographer, lecturer, and teacher
Susette (given name) or Suzette (given name) or Susette is a given name

See also
Suzette (given name)